Uronic acids or alduronic acids are a class of sugar acids with both carbonyl and carboxylic acid functional groups.   They are sugars in which the hydroxyl group furthest from the carbonyl group has been oxidized to a carboxylic acid. Usually the sugar is an aldose, but fructuronic acid also occurs. Oxidation of the terminal aldehyde instead yields an aldonic acid, while oxidation of both the terminal hydroxyl group and the aldehyde yields an aldaric acid.  The names of uronic acids are generally based on their parent sugars, for example, the uronic acid analog of glucose is glucuronic acid.  Uronic acids derived from hexoses are known as hexuronic acids and uronic acids derived from pentoses are known as penturonic acids.

Examples
Some of these compounds have important biochemical functions; for example, many wastes in the human body are excreted in the urine as their glucuronate salts, and iduronic acid is a component of some structural complexes such as proteoglycans.

See also 
 Gluconic acid
 Glucuronic acid
 Isosaccharinic acid

References

External links
 
 Synthesis at chembio.uoguelph.ca

 
Sugar acids
Vicinal diols